Dicky Firasat (born July 16, 1981 in Bandung, West Java) is an Indonesian footballer that currently plays for Persijap Jepara in the Indonesia Super League.

References

External links
 

1981 births
Association football forwards
Living people
Indonesian footballers
Liga 1 (Indonesia) players
Arema F.C. players
Persela Lamongan players
Persib Bandung players
Persibo Bojonegoro players
Indonesian Premier Division players
Persikab Bandung players
Sportspeople from Bandung